Tamasopo is a municipality and town in the Mexican state of San Luis Potosí.

Geography

Tamasopo is located in the foothills of the Sierra Madre Oriental. The surrounding mountains rise to about 5,000 feet (1,500 m) above sea level. Tamasopo is famous for its enchanting waterfalls in a lush rain forest

El Puente de Dios is two miles (3 km) northwest of Tamasopo town.  It consists of waterfalls into a narrow gorge and cavern beneath an arch through which the Gallinas river runs rapidly.  Blue and clear water pools for swimming are at the top and bottom of the cavern. The Cascada de Tamasopo is two miles (3 km) north of the town.  It features three cascades tumbling about  into pools divided by travertine ledges and shelves. The character of the waterfalls reminds some travelers of Havasu Falls in the Grand Canyon.  Nearby is El Trampolin which consists of small waterfalls falling into clear, deep pools in the midst of a tropical forest.

Climate

The climate of Tamasopo is classified as sub-tropical Cwa (Koppen) or Cwal (Trewartha).

History

Tamasopo is located in the Huasteca region, named after the indigenous people of the area. Indigenous people number 4,461 people in the municipality of whom 2,950 speak an indigenous language.  The indigenous population belongs mostly to two groups: the Huastecas who traditionally lived in the southern portion of the municipality and the Pame who lived in the northern part of the municipality.

See also
Agua Puerca

References

External links
Official Website

Municipalities of San Luis Potosí